Lina Braake (Brechtian subtitle: Die Interessen der Bank können nicht die Interessen sein, die Lina Braake hat) is a 1975 West German drama film directed by Bernhard Sinkel and starring Lina Carstens, Fritz Rasp and Herbert Bötticher.

The film's sets were designed by the art director Nicos Perakis.

Cast
 Lina Carstens as Lina Braake 
 Fritz Rasp as Gustaf Haertlein 
 Herbert Bötticher as Johannes Koerner 
 Ellen Mahlke as Scholz 
 Benno Hoffmann as Jawlonski 
 Rainer Basedow as Fink 
 Erica Schramm as Lene Schoener 
 Walter Sedlmayr as Emil Schoener 
 Oskar von Schab as Duerr 
 Gustl Datz as Gruber 
 Ellen Frank as Mangold 
 Wilfried Klaus as Wenzel 
 Teseo Tavernese as Ettore Falconi

References

Bibliography 
 Reimer, Robert C. & Reimer, Carol J. The A to Z of German Cinema. Scarecrow Press, 2010.

External links 
 

1975 films
1975 drama films
1970s crime comedy films
German drama films
German crime comedy films
West German films
1970s German-language films
Films directed by Bernhard Sinkel
Films about old age
Films about con artists
1975 comedy films
1970s German films